Benigno Ferrera (30 January 1893 – 24 November 1988) was an Italian cross-country skier. He competed in the men's 50 kilometre event at the 1924 Winter Olympics.

References

External links
 

1893 births
1988 deaths
Italian male cross-country skiers
Olympic cross-country skiers of Italy
Cross-country skiers at the 1924 Winter Olympics
Sportspeople from the Province of Verbano-Cusio-Ossola